Radio Salve Regina is a Corsican Christian radio station created in 1993. Its aim is to promote the religious, social, rural and cultural development of the Corsican people. Founded on the initiative of the Capuchin friars of the Saint Antoine convent in Bastia, it is part of the French-speaking community of Christian radio stations.

Frequencies
Bastia : 97.9
Calvi : 93.6
Cannes : DAB+
Corte : 100.4
Ghisonaccia : 101.1
La Porta : 94.6
Monaco : DAB+
Morosaglia : 97.8
Nice : DAB+

Sources
 Salve Regina, la voix de Saint-Antoine depuis 25 ans - Corse Matin
 Bastia : 25 bougies pour Salve Regina - Corse Net Infos
 Salve Regina - Diocèse d'Ajaccio
 Salve Regina - FRASE

Christian radio stations
Radio stations established in 1993